The  Green Bay Packers season was their 83rd season overall and their 81st season in the National Football League.

The Packers returned to the postseason after two years of missing the playoffs in the 1999 and 2000 seasons.

They finished with a 12–4 record. After easily defeating the San Francisco 49ers in the wild card round, Green Bay's season ended with a loss to the 14–2 St. Louis Rams in the NFC divisional playoff game, in which quarterback Brett Favre threw a career high six interceptions.

This remains the last season in which the Packers defeated the 49ers in the playoffs as the Packers went on to lose 4 straight playoff games to them.

Offseason

Notable transactions 
 March 31, 2001 – The Green Bay Packers traded Matt Hasselbeck and their 1st round pick to the Seattle Seahawks in exchange for the Seahawks 1st and 3rd round picks.

Free agents

2001 NFL draft 
With their first round pick (10th overall) in the 2001 NFL draft, the Green Bay Packers selected defensive end Jamal Reynolds.

Undrafted Free Agents

Personnel

Staff

Roster

Preseason

Regular season

Schedule 
The second game in 2001 was the first time since 1988 that the Packers played the Washington Redskins. because before the admission of the Texans in 2002, NFL scheduling formulas for games outside a team’s division were influenced much more by table position during the previous season, and there was no rotation of opponents in other divisions of a team’s own conference. The Packers finished 12–4 overall, placing 2nd in the NFC Central Division (behind the Chicago Bears), and qualifying for a wild card playoff spot.

Standings

Playoffs

References 

Green Bay Packers seasons
Green Bay Packers
Green